Barb Rugolo was a World Series of Poker champion in the 2003 $1,000 Ladies - Hold'em and Limit 7 Card Stud.

As of 2008, her total WSOP tournament winnings exceed $40,700.

World Series of Poker bracelets

References

American poker players
World Series of Poker bracelet winners
Year of birth missing (living people)
Living people
Female poker players